Luisa Görlich (born 21 December 1998) is a German ski jumper who has competed at World Cup level since the 2015/16 season.

Career
Görlich's best individual World Cup result is 13th place in Pyeongchang on 16 February 2017. In the Continental Cup, her best individual result is second in Notodden on 16–17 December 2016. At the Junior World Championships, she won a team gold medal in 2017, and a mixed team silver medal in 2018.

World Championship results

References

External links

1998 births
Living people
German female ski jumpers
21st-century German women
FIS Nordic World Ski Championships medalists in ski jumping